The 2022–23 Richmond Spiders men's basketball team represented the University of Richmond during the 2022–23 NCAA Division I men's basketball season. They were led by 18th-year head coach Chris Mooney and played their home games at the Robins Center as members of the Atlantic 10 Conference.

On February 17, 2023, Richmond announced that Mooney would miss the remainder of the 2022–23 season due to heart surgery to address an aneurysm in his ascending aorta. Assistant coach and former Richmond player Peter Thomas will serve as interim head coach in Mooney's absence.

Previous season
The Spiders finished the 2021–22 season 24–13, 10–8 in Atlantic 10 play to finish in sixth place. As the No. 6 seed, they defeated Rhode Island, VCU, Dayton, and Davidson to win the Atlantic 10 tournament. They received the conference’s automatic bid to the NCAA tournament as the No. 12 seed in the Midwest Region, where they upset Iowa in the First Round before losing to Providence in the Second Round.

Offseason

Departures

Returning players 
With the NCAA granting student-athletes an extra year of eligibility due to impacts from the COVID-19 pandemic, two scholarship Spiders who would have otherwise exhausted their eligibility elected to return for the 2021–22 season: Matt Grace and Andre Gustavson.

2022 recruiting class

Other new players
In addition to freshman Walz, Richmond also brought in three new players via transfer: Neal Quinn from Lafayette, Isaiah Bigelow from Wofford, and Jason Roche from The Citadel.

Roster

Schedule and results
Richmond announced a 30-game schedule on September 7, 2022, with a final game against Wichita State announced on September 15. The non-conference schedule began on November 7 with a home game against VMI and concluded with a December 28 home game against Coppin State. Richmond's 18-game Atlantic 10 schedule will see the Spiders facing VCU, George Mason, George Washington, and St. Bonaventure twice each and all other conference teams once each.

|-
!colspan=12 style=| Non-conference regular season

|-
!colspan=12 style=| A-10 regular season

|-
!colspan=9 style=| A-10 tournament

Source

References

Richmond
Richmond Spiders men's basketball seasons
Richmond Spiders men's basketball
Richmond Spiders men's basketball